Turkish Armenians include:

Arts and entertainment
Rober Hatemo (born 1974), singer
Şahan Arzruni (born 1943), pianist
Nonna Bella, singer
Hayko Cepkin (born 1978), musician
Jaklin Çarkçı (born 1958), mezzo-soprano
Masis Aram Gözbek (born 1987), conductor of Bosphorus Jazz Choir
Ara Güler (1928–2018), photojournalist
 (1925–2002), actor
 (born 1939), actress
Sirvart Kalpakian Karamanuk (1912–2008), composer
Cem Karaca (1945–2004), rock musician (Armenian mother)
Toto Karaca (1912–1992), actress
Ferdi Özbeğen (1941–2013), musician (Armenian mother)
Udi Hrant Kenkulian (1901–1978), oud player
Yaşar Kurt (born 1968), rock artist
Adile Naşit (1930–1987), actress (Armenian mother)
 (1928–2000), actor (Armenian mother)
Kenan Pars (1920–2008), actor
Sibil Pektorosoğlu (born 1974), pop singer
Ruhi Su (1912–1985), folk musician
, musician
 (born 1948), actress
Onno Tunç (1948–1996), musician
 (born 1978), opera singer
(born 1969), veteran film critic, journalist, and editor

Religion
Patriarch Karekin II Kazancıian (1927–1998)
Patriarch Mesrob II Mutafian (1956–2019)
Patriarch Shenork I Kaloustian (1913–1990)
Levon Zekian (born 1943),  Armenian Catholic Archeparch of Istanbul

Sciences
Daron Acemoglu (born 1967), economist, winner of the 2005 John Bates Clark Medal
Agop Dilâçar (1895–1979), linguist and the head specialist of the Turkish Language Association between 1942-1979.

Sports
Can Arat (born 1984), soccer player
Alen Markarian (born 1966), leader of Çarşı, leading fan group of Beşiktaş J.K., journalist
Aras Özbiliz (born 1990), football (soccer) player playing for the Armenia national team

Writers
Arat Dink (born 1979), son of Hrant Dink, editor of Agos
Hrant Dink (1954–2007), former editor of the weekly Agos
 (1913–1987), writer
Hrand Nazariantz (1880–1962), journalist and poet 
Zahrad (1924–2007), poet
Sevan Nisanyan (born 1956), writer and linguist

Other people
Selina Özuzun Doğan (born 1977), lawyer and politician
Garo Paylan (born 1972), politician
Artin Penik (1921–1982), committed suicide in response to ASALA bombings

See also
Armenians in Turkey
List of Ottoman Armenians
Lists of Armenians
Armenians in Istanbul

Turkish
+
Armenian